

This article presents a timeline of events in the history of the United Kingdom from 1990 until the present. For a narrative explaining the overall developments, see the related history of the British Isles. For narratives covering this time period, see Political history of the United Kingdom (1979–present) and Social history of the United Kingdom (1979–present)

United Kingdom

England

Scotland

Wales

See also
 Timeline of British history
 History of England
 History of Northern Ireland
 History of Scotland
 History of Wales
 History of the United Kingdom

British history timelines